Radio Free Montenegro is a radio station in Montenegro. Its headquarters are in Podgorica.

Radio stations in Montenegro
Mass media in Podgorica